Luis María Cabello y Lapiedra (28 December 1863, Madrid - 15 August 1936, El Escorial) was a Spanish architect and architectural critic.

Life 
His ideology was conservative and close to that of Enrique Repullés and his nephew Luis Martínez-Feduchi. He opposed modernism and represented a regenerationist-nationalist current in Spanish architecture. His works include the Real Academia Nacional de Medicin.

His brother was the writer Xavier Cabello Lapiedra. During the Second Spanish Republic he acted as secretary general to Renovación Española and was executed during the Spanish Civil War.

Sources

19th-century Spanish architects
20th-century Spanish architects
1863 births
1936 deaths
People killed in the Spanish Civil War
People from Madrid
Civil governors of Guadalajara